Warren Ray Hair (July 18, 1918 – December 21, 2006) was an American professional basketball player. He played in the National Basketball League for the Kankakee Gallagher Trojans during the 1937–38 season and averaged 4.2 points per game.

References 

1918 births
2006 deaths
American men's basketball players
Basketball players from Chicago
Guards (basketball)
Kankakee Gallagher Trojans players
Basketball players from Houston
American military personnel of World War II